Souzar (Suuzar) is a rural locality (a selo) in Ust-Koksinsky District, the Altai Republic, Russia. The population was 25 as of 2016. There is the only one street.

Geography 
Souzar is located 71 km northwest of Ust-Koksa (the district's administrative centre) by road. Talda is the nearest rural locality.

References 

Rural localities in Ust-Koksinsky District